An Interrupted Divorce is a 1916 Australian short comedy film directed by John Gavin starring popular vaudeville comedian Fred Bluett.

It was in three parts.

It was originally known as The Revue Girls.

Its release was delayed due to the lack of film stock in the country.

A contemporary critic said that "Miss Gwen Lewis, the clever monologuist of the Royal Strollers, has been entrusted with the leading role, and has proved her versatility by giving an excellent portrayal of the character entrusted to her. Everything points to Miss Lewis making as big a success on the screen as on the speaking stage." The movie screened as a supporting item to the main feature.

It is considered a lost film.

Cast
Fred Bluett
Vera Remee
The Revue Girls including Gwen Lewis
Palladium Ballet

Reception
The Moving Picture World said it was "very amusing".

References

External links

An Interrupted Divorce at Australian Variety Theatre Archive.

1916 films
Lost Australian films
Australian silent films
Australian comedy films
1916 comedy films
Australian black-and-white films
Films directed by John Gavin